Quantum nanoscience is the basic research area at the intersection of nanoscale science and quantum science that creates the understanding that enables development of nanotechnologies. It uses quantum mechanics to explore and use coherent quantum effects in engineered nanostructures. This may eventually lead to the design of new types of nanodevices and nanoscopic scale materials, where functionality and structure of quantum nanodevices are described through quantum  phenomena such as superposition and entanglement. With the growing work toward realization of quantum computing, quantum has taken on new meaning that describes the effects at this scale. Current quantum refers to the quantum mechanical phenomena of superposition, entanglement and quantum coherence that are engineered instead of naturally-occurring phenomena.

Fundamental concepts

Coherence 
Quantum nanoscience explores and uses coherent quantum effects in engineered nanostructures. Coherence is the property of a quantum system that allows to predict its evolution in time, once it has been prepared in a superposition of different quantum states. This property is important when one intends to use the system for specific tasks, such as performing a sequence of logic operations in a quantum computer. Quantum coherence is fragile and can easily be lost if the system becomes too large or is subjected to uncontrolled interactions with the environment. Quantum coherence-enabled functionality holds the promise of making possible disruptive technologies such as quantum computing, quantum communication, quantum simulation, and quantum sensing. Coherent quantum effects at the nanoscale are relatively uncharted territory. Therefore, the field of quantum nanoscience is special among basic sciences because it provides a pathway into this frontier of human knowledge.

Quantum coherence is at the very heart of quantum nanoscience. The goal of the field is to manipulate and exploit quantum-coherent functionality. Much of the quantum nanoscience is dedicated to understanding the mechanisms of decoherence in order to preserve and maximize coherence.

Superposition
Superposition is the quantum phenomena wherein an entity can simultaneously exist in two states. The classic description is the thought experiment of Schroedinger’s Cat. In this gedanken experiment, the cat can be both alive and dead until the state of the cat is actually observed.

Entanglement
Entanglement can link the quantum states of two or more objects over any distance. Entanglement lies at the heart of quantum teleportation and quantum communication.

Enabling constituents

The pursuit of quantum coherence-enabled functionality includes the enabling fields of quantum nanoscientific research, such as enabling materials and tools that are directed towards the goal of achieving coherence-enabled functionality. The elements of quantumness, materials, tools, and fabrication are all quantum and/or nano. Quantum nanoscience can include these as long as they are in pursuit of path toward quantum coherent functionality.

Applications

 Quantum computing
 Quantum communication is ultra-secure, hack-proof communication using entangled states.
 Quantum simulator
 Quantum sensing uses a quantum state in order to sense another object. The fragility of coherence can be turned into a resource by using the loss of coherence of the quantum system as a sensitive tool to probe the environment itself.

See also
 Quantum
 Quantum computer
 Kavli Prize - awards for outstanding scientific work in the fields of astrophysics, nanoscience and neuroscience
 Center for Quantum Nanoscience

References

Further reading
 
 
 
 

 
 Gerard J. Milburn, Paul Davies, Schrödinger's Machines: The Quantum Technology Reshaping Everyday Life
  Deutsch D., Physics, Philosophy, and Quantum Technology, in the Proceedings of the Sixth International Conference on Quantum Communication, Measurement and Computing, Shapiro, J.H. and Hirota, O., Eds. (Rinton Press, Princeton, NJ. 2003)
 V.E. Tarasov, Quantum Nanotechnology, International Journal of Nanoscience. Vol.8. No.4-5. (2009) 337—344.

External links
 Department of Quantum Nanoscience - Kavli Institute of Nanoscience
 Quantum Nanoscience Group - The Australian Research Council Nanotechnology Network
 Center for Quantum Nanoscience
 Mike and Ophelia Lazaridis Quantum Nanoscience Center
 Quantum Nanoscience Division - Peter Grünberg Institute, Research Center Jülich

Nanotechnology
Quantum mechanics